Həsənsu (also, Alekseyevka, Alekseyevo Selo, Kirovkənd, and Kirovka) is a village and municipality in the Agstafa Rayon of Azerbaijan.  It has a population of 2,841.

References 

Populated places in Aghstafa District